Lentibacillus amyloliquefaciens is a Gram-positive, non-spore-forming, aerobic, rod-shaped and halophilic bacterium from the genus of Lentibacillus which has been isolated from saline sediments from the Yantai City.

References

Bacillaceae
Bacteria described in 2016